Hercules (also known as Hercules Action Game and as Disney's Action Game Featuring Hercules and Disney's Action Game Featuring Disney's Hercules in Europe) is a 1997 platform game based on the 1997 film of the same name. Versions were released for the PlayStation, Microsoft Windows, and Game Boy on July 3, 1997, in North America and on November 14, 1997, in Europe. In 2010, the PlayStation version was made available on the PlayStation Store.

Plot
The game follows the same storyline from the animated film. Hercules, son of Zeus, is stripped of his godhood and must prove that he is a true hero in order to regain his immortality, and join Zeus and the other gods on Mount Olympus. To do that, Hercules must pass several tasks and defeat many villains, and at the end, face Hades, ruler of the dead, who is also responsible for Hercules' losing of his immortality.

Gameplay
The game is mainly two-dimensional, although in many missions the player can walk to other planes via pathways or stairs. There are ten levels and three difficulty modes: Beginner, Medium, and Herculean. The last two levels are playable only on Medium and Herculean difficulties. There are three rush levels in the game in which the player must run forward through the map and avoid obstacles without being able to stop or fight.

The player's health can be increased by picking up Hercules Action Figures and drinking Herculade cups found throughout the game. The player's main weapon is the sword; Hercules can also punch, but this is a much more difficult way to defeat enemies. Weapon powerups, known as Gifts of the Gods, can be found throughout the game, consisting of the Lightning Sword (shoots lightning any direction Hercules aims when selected and fired), Fireball Sword (shoots fireballs that seek out onscreen enemies when selected and fired), and the Sonic Sword (affects enemy targets at close range with a circular sonic blast when selected and fired). There is also a helmet which grants the player a few seconds of invulnerability when activated. Powerups have limited action, and once their energy has depleted, they can no longer be used.

In many levels there are hidden letters that, if collected, will form the word HERCULES and will allow the player to spawn directly at the next level, instead of starting the game over from the beginning. There are also four hidden vases in each mission, that upon collection will give the player a password save for the current level. Most of the bosses cannot be defeated by conventional fighting and require the player to perform special actions to pass. Among the enemies that Hercules faces are Nessus the Centaur, the Minotaur, the Harpies, the Hydra, the Stymphalian birds, the Thebans, skeleton warriors, the Gorgon, Hades, several Titans, and a Cyclops.

Re-releases
The PlayStation version of the game was re-released by Majesco Sales in 1998 with an E rating (which replaced the ESRB's "Kids to Adults" rating the same year) and the words "Action Game" removed from the title.

The PlayStation version of the game was re-released as a PSOne Classic on the PlayStation Store on March 8, 2011. The PC version of the game was re-released on GOG.com on May 17, 2019 and Steam.

Reception

The game divided critics. Whether a review gave a positive or negative recommendation largely hinged on the reviewer's opinion of the game's use of stereotypical last generation gameplay with modern elements. GameSpot, for example, described Disney's Hercules as a sort of greatest hits of the "16-bit" Disney titles, incorporating the best elements of those games while still having enough advances to take it "to the 32-bit level", and accordingly concluded it to be a must-have. Dan Hsu of Electronic Gaming Monthly similarly said that "Hercules takes everything you liked from old side-scrolling classics and gives them a big 32-bit boost". On the other side, Next Generation said it "follows the style set out by every single side-scrolling action title of the 16-bit era, so much so in fact that it feels like a Genesis game: Walk from left to right, hacking at centaurs and other mythological creatures with a sword. It's all been done before, and done better as well". He noted that there were modern gameplay elements but found them to be largely superficial. GamePro similarly remarked: "The main problem is that we've all played this game before, just with different dressings".

Most critics applauded the game's mixture of polygons and sprites, both for the high quality of those elements and the way they were seamlessly integrated with each other. GamePro partially disagreed, citing severe pixelation, but acknowledged that the hand-drawn animation is impressive. The usage of music and voices from the film was also widely praised.

At the 1999 Milia festival in Cannes, Hercules took home a "Gold" prize for revenues above €15 million in the European Union during 1998.

Notes

References

External links
 
 

1997 video games
Game Boy games
Single-player video games
Disney video games
Disney Interactive
Platform games
PlayStation (console) games
Side-scrolling video games
Tiertex Design Studios games
Video games based on adaptations
Video games based on animated films
Video games based on films
Video games based on Greek mythology
Video games scored by Steve Duckworth
Video games set in antiquity
Video games set in Greece
Windows games
Eurocom games
Virgin Interactive games
Sony Interactive Entertainment games
THQ games
Hercules (franchise)
Video games developed in the United Kingdom